A list of notable National Hunt horse races which take place annually in Great Britain, under the authority of the British Horseracing Authority, including all races which currently hold Grade 1, 2 or Premier Handicap status.

History of the National Hunt Pattern 
A National Hunt (NH) Pattern of important races was first recognized in 1964 when the Horserace Betting Levy Board made a grant of £64,000 to fund a "prestige race allocation" split between the Cheltenham Gold Cup, Champion Hurdle and Grand National. In 1968 a Jump Racing Pattern Committee headed by Lord Leverhulme recommended the creation of a formal NH Pattern, which came into being in 1969 with 14 races initially. The Pattern underwent further revisions in the 1980s and was subject to a major change in 1989 when the Jockey Club, the governing body of British horseracing at the time, overhauled the Pattern to create a mid-season and season-ending Grade 1 race in each of twelve categories, with lead-up Grade 2 races and a set of 14 major handicaps of Grade 3 status. This forms the basis of the current Pattern, which has since been subject to further changes in status and number of races.

From the 2022–23 season Grade 3 handicaps have been renamed Premier Handicaps and Listed handicaps have been removed from the pattern, either becoming Premier Handicaps or being downgraded to Class 2 status.

Grade 1

Grade 2

Premier Handicaps

Selected other races

Discontinued

† Distances in miles and furlongs

References

British Jump Pattern Book 2019-20
Jump Pattern changes 2018/19
BHA Jump Race upgrades for 2016/17 season

National Hunt races
Horse racing-related lists
National Hunt races